Mylvakanam Srikantha, OBE (17 September 1913 – 4 February 1982) was a leading Ceylon Tamil civil servant.

Early life and family
Srikantha was born on 17 September 1913. He was the son of Mylvakanam, a school master from Alaveddy in northern Ceylon. He was educated at Jaffna Hindu College.

Srikantha married Maheswari, daughter of Kasturiar K. Muttucumaru. They had two sons (Yogalingam and Janakan) and a daughter (Malini).

Career
Srikantha joined the Ceylon Civil Service in 1937. He held several positions and served in a number of places. He was Assistant Government Agent in Puttalam (1948); Government Agent of Northern Province (1954); and Government Agent of Jaffna District (1955–61).

Srikantha was made a Member of the Order of the British Empire in the 1953 New Year Honours. He was made an Officer of the Order of the British Empire in the 1955 Birthday Honours.

Srikantha was then Permanent Secretary at the Ministry of Agriculture and Lands and the Ministry of Irrigation and Power. He retired in 1969.

Death
Srikantha died on 4 February 1982.

References

1913 births
1982 deaths
Alumni of Jaffna Hindu College
Ceylonese Officers of the Order of the British Empire
Government Agents (Sri Lanka)
People from Northern Province, Sri Lanka
People from British Ceylon
Permanent secretaries of Sri Lanka
Sri Lankan Tamil civil servants